Elisabetta Secci (born 10 July 1962) is an Italian former footballer who played as a defender for Lazio.

International career
Secci was also part of the Italian team at the 1984 European Championships.

References

1962 births
Italian women's footballers
Serie A (women's football) players
Italy women's international footballers
Women's association football midfielders
S.S. Lazio Women 2015 players
Torres Calcio Femminile players
ASDF Juventus Torino players
Italian football managers
Female association football managers
Living people